Siegbert Rippe (born 23 May 1936 in Montevideo) is a Uruguayan lawyer and jurist.

He specialized in commercial law.

He has presided over the Uruguayan Court of Audit since July 2010.

References

External links
CV of Siegbert Rippe 

1936 births
Uruguayan people of German descent
People from Montevideo
University of the Republic (Uruguay) alumni
Academic staff of the University of the Republic (Uruguay)
Uruguayan jurists
Living people